Music for People is the second album by the band VAST, released in September 12, 2000 by Elektra Records.  It would be VAST's last album on Elektra Records.  After the success of VAST's debut album, Music for People could only produce one successful single, "Free", which gained major MTV exposure.  However, after the mixed success of the album, VAST and Elektra Records parted ways over disappointing sales and differing views on the future of the band.

Track listing
All songs written by Jon Crosby.
"The Last One Alive" – 3:38
"Free" – 3:07
"I Don't Have Anything" – 3:46
"The Gates of Rock 'N' Roll" – 3:24
"What Else Do I Need" – 3:37
"Blue" – 3:25
"Land of Shame" – 3:26
"A Better Place" – 3:23
"Song Without a Name" – 3:32
"We Will Meet Again" – 3:39
"My TV and You" – 2:40
"Lady of Dreams" – 2:53

Reception

Allmusic gave the album a four out of five, stating the album "is bizarre and beautiful in capturing social apathy." Select gave the album a negative review of one out of five, opining that the album was a "long-winded metal opus" and felt its content was closer to the band Babybird than Metallica or Jane's Addiction.

References

VAST albums
2000 albums